In geology, a disturbance is a linear zone of disturbed rock strata stretching for many miles across country which comprises a combination of folding and faulting. The British Geological Survey record a number of such features in South Wales including the Neath Disturbance, Pontyclerc Disturbance, Carreg Cennen Disturbance and the Cribarth Disturbance, the latter sometimes also known (at least in part) as the Tawe Valley or Swansea Valley Disturbance. The southwestward continuation of the Carreg Cennen Disturbance is known as the Llandyfaelog Disturbance.

Other examples in Wales and the border counties of England include the Clun Forest, Saron, Trimsaran and Llannon (or 'Llanon') disturbances.  The Silverdale and Burtreeford disturbances are found in northern England.

List of disturbances
The following named features comprise both faulting and folding;

See also
 List of geological folds in Great Britain.\

References

Geology of Wales
Structural geology